Julio Galán (1958 or 1959 – August 4, 2006) was a Mexican artist and architect. Galán was one of Latin America's  neo-expressionist painters of the end of the last century and the beginning of this one.. His paintings and collages are full of elements that usually represent his life.

Biography 
Galán was born into a wealthy and conservative Roman Catholic family in Muzquiz, a northern Mexican mining town. As a child he attended private school in Monterrey, Mexico and later enrolled to study architecture at the University of Monterrey. Galán started his career in this town.

He was first brought to  attention by Andy Warhol, who printed several of Galán's works in his magazine, Interview, shortly after Galán moved to New York City in 1984. After that Galán started to exhibit in New York, Mexico and Europe. In 1994 he won the "Premio Marco" from the Museo de Arte Contemporaneo de Monterrey; in the same year he exhibited at the Center for Fine Arts in Miami, Florida, the Museo de Arte Moderno in México City, and the Contemporary Art Museum of Houston, Texas.

He died on the plane that was taking him back to Monterrey in 2006, after suffering a brain hemorrhage.

Notes

References

External links 
 Julio Galán New Official Website. https://web.archive.org/web/20100314060833/http://www.juliogalanweb.com/ "This is the Official source of information for all about Julio Galán".
 Adams, Brooks. "Julio Galan's hothouse icons - Museo de Arte Moderno, Mexico City, Mexico." Art in America, July 1994.
 Cotter, Holland. "ART IN REVIEW; Julio Galán." The New York Times, July 6, 2001.
 Laberintos website on Julio Galán  
 Article on Julio Galán Encyclopædia Britannica
 Official Site of Museum of Contemporary Art of Monterrey 
 del Conde, Teresa. "Julio Galán." La Jornada, July 23, 2002. 
Art in Review https://www.nytimes.com/2001/07/06/arts/art-in-review-julio-galan.html

1958 births
2006 deaths
20th-century Mexican painters
20th-century Mexican male artists
Mexican male painters
21st-century Mexican painters
21st-century Mexican male artists
Neo-expressionist artists